Dapu may refer to:

China
 Dapu, Hengdong (大浦镇), a town of Hengdong County, Hunan.
 Dapu, Liucheng County, town in Guangxi Province
 Dapu, Yixing, town in Yixing city, Jiangsu Province
 Dapu, Yongchun County, town in Fujian Province
 Dabu County, county of Meizhou City, Guangdong Province

Taiwan
 Dapu, Chiayi, township in Chiayi County, Taiwan

Other
 Dapu incident (2010), an eminent domain case in Zhunan, Miaoli, Taiwan
 Dapu, the process of transcribing old Guqin (musical instrument) tablature notation into a playable form